Bermudian English is a regional dialect of English found in Bermuda, a British overseas territory in the North Atlantic. Standard English is used in professional settings and in writing, while vernacular Bermudian English is spoken on more casual occasions.  The Bermudian dialect began to develop following settlement in the early 17th century and retains traits of Elizabethan English.

Casual observers tend to have difficulty in placing the Bermudian dialect, as it differs from those that are clearly British, American, or Caribbean; they also note that the accent tends to vary between individuals.  To Americans, it sounds slightly English, while those from the British Isles find it more American.

Categorisation

Bermudian English has been called "one of the most severely underresearched varieties of English". It primarily shows a mixture of traits typical of British English and American English, and is generally classified as a form of American (rather than Caribbean) English. The most detailed scholarly study of Bermudian English, in 1933, stated that this type of speech "would create least remark, if indeed any, between, say, Norfolk, Virginia, and Charleston, South Carolina" (Bermuda was settled as an extension of the Colony of Virginia, and Charleston and the Carolina Province were settled from Bermuda, and Bermuda retained close links with both into the 19th century, although the start of its tourism industry in the latter 19th century would see its transport connections move to the North East of the United States, from where most of its visitors continue to come; within the British Empire, Bermuda was administered not as part of the British West Indies but with the continental colonies to its west as part of British America until 1783, then as part of British North America, with closest ties to the Maritimes, until left out of the 1867 Confederation of Canada); Bermudian actor Earl Cameron noted that because the Bermudian accent sounded American, he was able to land a speaking role in London's West End in 1942. Large scale West Indian immigration to Bermuda, especially Sandys and Pembroke parishes, began with the expansion of the Royal Naval Dockyard (as a result of the lack of cheap, unskilled labour in Bermuda) at the turn of the twentieth century, and affected the dialect of certain demographic groups. Contemporary printed media record that West Indian agricultural labourers had also immigrated in the closing decades of the nineteenth century, when their waning maritime industries forced Bermudians to explore other industries, including agriculture, which was highly stigmatised resulting in a reliance on imported labour, primarily from the Portuguese Atlantic islands. Bermuda's eastern parishes (Devonshire, Smith's, Hamilton, and St. George's) were primarily engaged in shipbuilding, with most farming (or gardening, as Bermudians term it) taking place in the central and western parishes (Sandys, Southampton, Warwick, and Paget). Consequently, in certain aspects of vocalization, some Bermudian English dialects are close to some versions of Caribbean English, and some would bracket all these varieties to the broad region of the "English-speaking West Indies". Azorean Portuguese has also impacted on Bermudian English as a result of immigration since the 1840s.

Many West Indian workers immigrated to Bermuda during the 20th century, starting with hundreds of labourers brought in for the expansion of the Royal Naval Dockyard at the West End at the start of the century. Many others immigrated later in the century, settling mostly in Pembroke Parish and western Devonshire Parish, north of the City of Hamilton, and the "back of town" (of Hamilton) dialect and the English spoken by many blacks at the West End consequently reflects this. The West End also absorbed large numbers of civilian shipwrights and other workers from Britain who were employed at the dockyard until it was reduced to a base in 1951. The central parishes also absorbed considerable numbers of white immigrants from Britain and elsewhere, especially in the years following the Second World War (when the local government loosened immigration laws to encourage white immigration to counter the black immigration from the West Indies), speaking various varieties of Southern England English, Northern England English, and Scots, et cetera. The central parishes were also where most immigrants from Portuguese territories since the 1840s have settled, and many Bermudians in this area especially speak a Portuguese-influenced Bermudian English as a badge of pride, and most Bermudians without Portuguese ancestry can affect this way of speaking. The East End of Bermuda, which became increasingly cut off from investment and development after the capital moved from St. George's to Hamilton in 1815, has seen the least immigration during the course of the 20th century, with the least effect on the way English is spoken there, though the introduction of motor vehicles in 1948 has led to considerable spread of previously more isolated populations throughout Bermuda. The English of the St. David's Islanders, while often derided, is generally perceived as the most authentic form of Bermudian English.

Characteristics

The dialect's most evident characteristic is a variation in letter/sound assignment. The traditional Bermudian pronunciation of the word "boy", used in preference to the term "guy", was originally pronounced in the same way as in Newfoundland:  As in Newfoundland, when the word is used similarly, Bermudians still use this pronunciation, but otherwise generally now say  when speaking of a boy. Bermuda was generally linked administratively to the Maritimes from United States independence in 1783 until about 1870, at which point the formation of the Canadian dominion meant the British Government increasingly grouped Bermuda for convenience with the British West Indian colonies. It is unclear whether any similarities between Bermudian English and Newfoundland English date from this period, or pre-date it. Bermudian is also non-rhotic, like British English or New York accent. Coda [ɫ] is semivocalized to [w].

References

Languages attested from the 17th century
Dialects of English
Languages of Bermuda
English language in North America
Languages of the United Kingdom